The Grand Prix d'Aix-en-Provence was a single-day road cycling race held in the town of Aix-en-Provence, France between 1949 and 1986.

Winners

References

Cycle races in France
1949 establishments in France
Recurring sporting events established in 1949
1986 disestablishments in France
Recurring sporting events disestablished in 1986
Defunct cycling races in France